Sylvspente Boots is the first album by the Norwegian country group Hellbillies. The album was released in 1992 through Spinner Records.

Track listing

Hellbillies albums
1992 albums